The 1973 24 Hours of Daytona was a 24-hour endurance sports car race held on February 3–4, 1973 at the Daytona International Speedway road course. The race served as the opening round of the 1973 World Sportscar Championship.

Victory overall and in the Sport 3000 class went to the No. 59 Brumos Racing Porsche 911 Carrera RSR driven by Peter Gregg and Hurley Haywood. Victory in the Grand Touring +2000 class went to the No. 22 North American Racing Team Ferrari Daytona driven by François Migault and Milt Minter. Victory in the Touring 5000 class went to the No. 9 Ray Kessler, Inc. Chevrolet Camaro driven by Ray Kessler, Richie Panch, and Wilbur Pickett. Victory in the Grand Touring 2000 class went to the No. 62 Bob Bergstrom Porsche 911 driven by Bob Bergstrom and Jim Cook. Victory in the Sports 2000 class went to the No. 10 Shierson Racing Chevron B19 driven by Bill Barber and Charlie Kemp. Victory in the Touring 2000 class went to the No. 84 Andy Petery BMW 2002 driven by Andy Petery and Hans Ziereis.

Race results
Class winners in bold.

References

External links

24 Hours of Daytona
1973 in sports in Florida
1973 in American motorsport